Yekaterina Sergeyevna Vasilyeva (born 15 August 1945 in Moscow) is a Soviet and Russian theater and film actress. She performed in more than ninety films since 1967.

Vasilyeva was married to the late director Sergei Solovyov and playwright Mikhail Roshchin.

Selected filmography
 1965 They're Calling, Open the Door (Звонят, откройте дверь) as Physical education teacher
 1967 The Journalist as an employee of the department of letters
 1971 Bumbarash (Бумбараш) as Sofia Nikolaevna Tulchinskaya
 1973 This Merry Planet (Эта весёлая планета) as Z
 1974 The Straw Hat (Соломенная шляпка) as Madame Anais Bopertyui, hostess hats
 1978 An Ordinary Miracle (Обыкновенное чудо) as Emilia
 1980 Air Crew (Экипаж) as Timchenko’s wife
 1980 Do Not Part with Your Beloved (С любимыми не расставайтесь) as Nikulina
 1981 The Vacancy (Вакансия)
 1982 Charodei (Чародеи) as Kira Anatolyevna Shemahanskaya
 1998 Who If Not Us (Кто, если не мы) as mother at the parents' meeting
 2000 Come Look at Me (Приходи на меня посмотреть) as Sophia Ivanovna
 2009 Black Lightning (Чёрная молния) as Olga Andreevna Romantseva, academic
 2012 Anna German. Mystery of White Angel (Анна Герман. Тайна белого ангела) as Anna Frizen
 2012 Atomic Ivan ( Атомный Иван) as Ivan's grandmother

References

External links

Actresses from Moscow
1945 births
Living people
Russian film actresses
Soviet film actresses
Soviet stage actresses
Russian stage actresses
Recipients of the Order of Honour (Russia)
Honored Artists of the RSFSR
People's Artists of the RSFSR
Gerasimov Institute of Cinematography alumni
20th-century Russian women